The name Mayfair was applied to the 1951-53 Packard 200 as a hardtop coupe nameplate built by the Packard Motor Corporation in an attempt to compete in this body style with Cadillac, Buick, and Imperial from Chrysler, whose hardtop sales were booming. It was named for the  City of Westminster's luxurious district Mayfair in London, England.

Mayfair hardtops were built in the 1951 through 1953 model years.  The Mayfairs were succeeded in 1954 by the Pacific, which achieved Senior status with the inclusion of the 359 c.i. engine and full Senior trim.

Starting in 1955, Packard renamed its senior hardtop the Four Hundred.

References

Mayfair
Coupés
Cars introduced in 1951